The 2015 African Rally Championship was the 35th season of the African Rally Championship (ARC), the FIA regional zone rally championship for the African continent. The season began March 6 in the Côte d'Ivoire, and ended on November 8 in Madagascar, after seven events.

Jaspreet Singh Chatthe became the first Kenyan driver since David Horsey in 1984 to win the African championship when he won the Pearl of Africa Rally, securing the championship a round early. Singh Chatthe won three of the seven events – as well as a fourth class win at the Sasol Rally; the event being won overall by Mark Cronje – and won the championship by forty-six points of Jassy Singh from Zambia. Third place in the drivers' championship went to Ugandan driver Abdul Ssempebwa, a further twenty-one points in arrears. Aside from Singh Chatthe's victories, Gary Chaynes won the event in the Côte d'Ivoire and Mamy Patrick Solofonirina won in Madagascar, while no ARC-eligible competitors finished in Tanzania – the event was won by Gerard Miller.

Event calendar and results

The 2015 African Rally Championship was as follows:

Championship standings
The 2015 African Rally Championship points are as follows:

References

External links

African Rally Championship
African
Rally Championship